Zakrzyce may refer to the following places in Poland:
Zakrzyce, Lower Silesian Voivodeship (south-west Poland)
Zakrzyce, West Pomeranian Voivodeship (north-west Poland)